Silver 'n Percussion is an album by jazz pianist Horace Silver released on the Blue Note label in 1977.

Reception
The Allmusic review by Michael G. Nastos awarded the album 3 stars and states: "Silver's best work came prior to this recording, but this may be his best work of the 1970s. Even though it's a little short, at under 40 minutes, it's nonetheless recommended and, perhaps for the leader, worth a revisit."

Track listing
All compositions by Horace Silver
 "African Ascension Part 1: The Gods of Yoruba" –
 "African Ascension Part 2: The Sun God of the Masai" –
 "African Ascension Part 3: The Spirit of the Zulu" –
 "The Great American Indian Uprising Part 1: The Idols of the Incas" –
 "The Great American Indian Uprising Part 2: The Aztec Sun God" –
 "The Great American Indian Uprising Part 3: The Mohican and the Great Spirit" –
Recorded at Rudy Van Gelder Studio, Englewood Cliffs, NJ, November 12 (tracks 1–3) & 17 (tracks 4–6),1977 with vocal overdubs recorded on November 25 & 30, 1977.

Personnel
Horace Silver – piano, arrangements
Tom Harrell – trumpet
 Larry Schneider – tenor saxophone
Ron Carter – bass
Al Foster – drums
Babatunde Olatunji – percussion
Ladji Camara – percussion (tracks 1–3)
Omar Clay – percussion (tracks 4–6)
Fred Hardy, Lee C. Thomas, Fred Gripper, Bob Barnes, Bobby Clay, Peter Oliver Norman – vocals
Chapman Roberts – musical direction, vocals

References

Horace Silver albums
1977 albums
Blue Note Records albums
Albums recorded at Van Gelder Studio